Cedillo is a surname. Notable people with the surname include:

 Ángel Cedillo Hernández (born 1960), Mexican politician
 Enrique Cedillo (born 1996), Mexican professional footballer
 Gil Cedillo (born 1954), American politician
 Jaime Serrano Cedillo (1967–2012), deputy of Nezahualcóyotl, Mexico
 Julio Cesar Cedillo (born 1970), Mexican-American actor
 María Marcos Cedillo Salas, Mexican pilot
 Mónica Banegas Cedillo (born 1977), Ecuadorian politician
 Saturnino Cedillo (1890–1939), Mexican politician

Places
 Cedillo, town and municipality in the province of Cáceres, community of Extremadura, Spain
 Cedillo de la Torre, municipality in the province of Segovia, Castile and León, Spain
 Cedillo del Condado, municipality in the province of Toledo, Castile-La Mancha, Spain

See also
 Sedillo
 Cedillo v. Secretary of Health and Human Services, lawsuit